The Stuff That Dreams Are Made Of is a two-CD album of blues, country, and old-time music recordings that were originally released in the 1920s and 1930s on 78 rpm records.  Subtitled The Dead Sea Scrolls of Record Collecting, it is a compilation of songs from rare and hard-to-find records.  It was released in 2006.

The cover of The Stuff That Dreams Are Made Of is the size and shape of a DVD box.  The cover art is by Robert Crumb, a noted cartoonist and an avid collector of vintage 78 rpm records.  The album also includes a 20-page illustrated booklet.

According to the liner notes, the album was remastered using only a moderate level of noise reduction, with the goal of preserving as much as possible of the character and dynamic range of the original recordings.  As a result, some of the songs exhibit a considerable amount of noise due to surface wear and damaged grooves on the shellac phonograph records.

Critical reception 
On AllMusic Ronnie D. Lankford Jr. said, "...[T]his two-disc collection – all 46 cuts – is a testament to rarities....  But even for those who might not understand why they should be excited by The Stuff That Dreams Are Made Of, the collection nonetheless holds up as good old-time folk and blues, and expense-wise, Yazoo always offers lots of quality music for one's money."

In JazzTimes Christopher Porter wrote, "The cuts here are culled from test or personal pressings and last-existing-copies, making the collection a Holy Grail One Stop for fans of "American primitive" music by the likes of the Georgia Pot Lickers, Wilmer Watts and Son House (whose "Clarksdale Moan" alone is worth the price of admission). The set's sound quality is mostly fine considering the sources..."

In The Tuscaloosa News Ben Windham wrote, "The weird thing is, if the set is pitched to collectors, is the complete absence of the kind of nerdy discographical information that they feed on – recording dates, personnel lists, matrix numbers, even the labels on which the originals were issued.... This landmark collection, which brings all these recordings and dozens more together, is a tremendous artifact."

On Old Time Party Mike Yates said, "... [W]hilst a number of items are heard here on CD for the first time, it must be said that some tracks have been reissued previously elsewhere.... So, a superb collection of goodies that will send shivers down the spines of both blues and old-timey enthusiasts.... [J]ust let this double collection of musical gems flow through your veins."

Track listing 
Disc 1
"Croquet Habits" – Freeny's Barn Dance Band
"Mississippi County Farm Blues" – Son House
"Up Jumped the Rabbit" – Georgia Pot Lickers
"I'm Going Back Home" – Memphis Minnie & Joe McCoy
"Fightin' in the War with Spain" – Wilmer Watts and the Lonely Eagles
"Old Timbrook Blues" – John Byrd
"A Little Talk with Jesus" – Ernest Phipps and His Holiness Singers
"Slidin' Delta" – Tommy Johnson
"Alabama Blues" – The Three Stripped Gears
"Rollin' Dough Blues" – Jack Gowdlock
"Ginseng Blues" – Kentucky Ramblers
"Police and High Sheriff Come Ridin' Down" – Ollis Martin
"John Hardy Blues" – John Harvey & Jess Johnston and the West Virginia Ramblers
"Original Stack O'Lee Blues" – Long "Cleeve" Reed & Little Harvey Hull
"Two Step de la Prairie Soileau" – Amédé Ardoin & Dennis McGee
"Operator Blues" – Andrew & Jim Baxter
"The Grey Eagle" – J.D. Harris
"Jim Strainer Blues" – Memphis Jug Band
"Ain't That Trouble in Mind" – Grayson County Railsplitters
"Old Rub Alcohol Blues" – Dock Boggs
"Mistreatin' Mama" – Jaybird Coleman
"It's a Rough Road to Georgia" – Henry Whitter
"Live the Life" – Rev. B.L. Wightman with Lottie Kimbrough & congregation
Disc 2
"Sweet Mama" – Yank Rachell with Sleepy John Estes & Jab Jones
"We All Love Mother" – Crowder Brothers
"Clarksdale Moan" – Son House
"Bulldog Sal" – Ashley & Foster
"Down in Texas Blues" – Jesse "Babyface" Thomas
"Chicken Don't Roost Too High" – Georgia Pot Lickers
"I'm Leavin' Town (But I Sho' Don't Wanna Go)" – William Harris
"Wild Cat Rag" – Asa Martin & Roy Hobbs
"Whoopee Blues" – King Solomon Hill
"Davey Crockett" – Chubby Parker
"Skinny Leg Blues" – Geeshie Wiley
"I'm Gonna Marry That Pretty Little Girl" – Sweet Brothers
"I Shall Not Be Moved" – Blind Roosevelt Graves & Uaroy Graves
"Lonesome Road Blues" – Smith & Irvine
"If I Call You Mama" – Luke Jordan
"My Mind Is to Marry" – Grayson & Whitter
"Green River" – Osey Helton
"Don't Speak to Me" – Lottie Kimbrough
"Married Man's Blues" – Wade Ward
"Sweet Betsy from Pike" – Ken Maynard
"Boll Weevil" – Jaybird Coleman
"Bound Steel Blues" – Bill Shepherd with Hayes Shepherd & Ed Webb
"Bells of Love" – Middle Georgia Singing Convention No. 1

Personnel 
Richard Nevins – producer, mastering, liner notes
Robert Crumb – cover art
Lorien Babajian – package and booklet design

References 

Blues compilation albums
Country music compilation albums
Old-time music albums
2006 compilation albums